The Princeton Tigers women's basketball team is the intercollegiate women's basketball program representing Princeton University. The school competes in the Ivy League in Division I of the National Collegiate Athletic Association (NCAA). The Tigers play home basketball games at the Jadwin Gymnasium in Princeton, New Jersey on the university campus. Princeton has won sixteen Ivy League championships and will make their ninth appearance in an NCAA Women's Division I Basketball Championship in the 2022 tournament.

Highlights
The Tigers first season was the 1971–72 season. They began play with their first ever game being played on February 2, 1972. The 2009–10 team began one of the best overall record streaks in Princeton women's basketball history. Entering the post-season with a 26–2 overall record, the Tigers were one of five teams in the country with two or fewer losses. The other four teams earned No. 1 seeds in the NCAA Tournament. Sweeping the Ivy League with a 14–0 mark, the Tigers earned a No. 12 seed to the NCAA Tournament. In 2011–12, Princeton was the first-ever Ivy League women's team to receive a national ranking. The Tigers moved into the AP Top 25 Poll, earning a No. 24 national ranking in the Week 18 poll. The Tigers won their third consecutive Ivy League Championship that season and earned the No. 9 seed into the NCAA Tournament. In 2012–13, Princeton earned the No. 9 seed, after winning the Ivy League for the fourth consecutive season. Niveen Rasheed earned an Associated Press All-American recognition that season. The 2014–15 team finished the season 31–1, 14–0 to win the Ivy League regular season title to earn an automatic trip to the 2015 NCAA Division I women's basketball tournament, which they lost to Maryland in the second round. The Tigers' No. 13 ranking in both the Associated Press Top-25 and USA Today Coaches polls are the highest in conference history. Princeton's No. 8 seed is the best an Ivy program has ever earned, and the Tigers' first round win over Green Bay was just the second NCAA victory for an Ivy team, joining No. 16 Harvard's upset over No. 1 Stanford in 1998.

During the 2016–17 season, head coach Courtney Banghart notched her 200th win, all within her Princeton tenure.

2019–20 roster

Coaches

Ivy League

Postseason

NCAA Division I
The Tigers have made the NCAA Division I women's basketball tournament ten times. They have a record of 3–10.

AIAW College Division/Division II
The Tigers made one appearance in the AIAW National Division II basketball tournament, with a combined record of 1–1.

References

External links
 

 
Basketball teams established in 1971